Arjun Ram Meghwal (born 20 December 1953) is an Indian politician and the current Minister of State for Parliamentary Affairs & Culture in the Second Modi ministry. A member of the Bharatiya Janata Party, Meghwal formerly served as Chief Whip and Minister of State for Heavy Industries and Public Enterprises. He was first elected to the Lok Sabha in 2009 representing the Bikaner constituency, Rajasthan. He was awarded the Best Parliamentarian in 2013.

Early life 
He was born to Lakhu Ram Meghwal and Hira Devi in a small village of Kishmidesar in Bikaner, Rajasthan. He is a Master of Arts in Pol. Science, LLB and MBA from Dungar College in Bikaner and University of Philippines in Philippines. He was also an IAS Officer in Rajasthan Cadre and seen as the face of Schedule caste in Rajasthan.

He is married Pana Devi and is blessed with 2 sons and 2 daughters. He is a good player of Badminton and is a Farmer and Educationist by profession. His cousin Madan Gopal Meghwal is also a politician from Indian National Congress.

Career
After completing graduation in Law in the year 1977 and post-graduation in Arts in the year 1979 as a regular student, In 1982, he qualified the RAS Exams and got elected for the Rajasthan Udhyog Seva. He was appointed as Assistant Director in the Jila Udhyog Kendra and worked as the General Manager of Jila Udhyog Kendra of Jhunjhnu, Dhaulpur, Rajsamvad, Jaipur, Alwar & Shriganganagar districts of Rajasthan.

In the year 1994, he was appointed as the Officer on Special Duty to Mr. Hari Shankar Bhabhra, then Deputy Chief Minister of Rajasthan. While working as OSD to Deputy Chief Minister of Rajasthan was also having charge of the General Manager of Jila Udhyog Kendra, Jaipur. In the same year, he was elected as the State President for Rajasthan Udhyog Seva Parisad. Then, he was appointed as Additional Collector (Development) in Barmer. Later on, he won the election of General Secretary for Dr. Ambedkar Memorial Welfare Society, Rajasthan. He was promoted as IAS officer of the 1999 batch in Rajasthan cadre & worked on many administrative posts like Deputy Secretary, Technical Education; Special Secretary, Higher Education; Managing Director, Rajasthan Laghu Udhyog Nigam Limited; Additional Commissioner; Commercial Tax Department; District Collector and District Magistrate, Churu. He took voluntary retirement from the Indian Administrative Service in order to join politics.

Political life 

In the year 2009, he got elected as the Member of Parliament representing the Bhartiya Janata Party from Bikaner Constituency. On 2 June 2009, took oath as a Member of Parliament in Lok Sabha. In the general election 2014, he got re-elected from the Bikaner Constituency for 16th Lok Sabha. During his 2nd term as an MP, he was Chief Whip of Bhartiya Janta Party in Lok Sabha. Speaker of Lok Sabha also nominated him as the Chairman of House Committee, Lok Sabha.

In May 2019, Meghwal became Minister of State for Parliamentary Affairs and Heavy Industries and Public Enterprises.

References

Bharatiya Janata Party politicians from Rajasthan
Living people
1954 births
India MPs 2009–2014
People from Bikaner
Lok Sabha members from Rajasthan
India MPs 2014–2019
Narendra Modi ministry
Indian Administrative Service officers
India MPs 2019–present
Dalit leaders
Dalit politicians